Chile participated in the 2010 Summer Youth Olympics in Singapore..

Medalists

Athletics

Boys
Track and Road Events

Field Events

Girls
Track and Road Events

Basketball

Girls

Cycling 

Cross Country

Time Trial

BMX

Road Race

Overall

 * Received -5 for finishing road race with all three racers

Equestrian

Football

Girls

Group B

Semi-finals

Final

Gymnastics

Artistic Gymnastics

Girls

Hockey

Sailing

One Person Dinghy

Swimming

Triathlon

Girls

Mixed

References

External links
Competitors List: Chile

2010 in Chilean sport
Nations at the 2010 Summer Youth Olympics
Chile at the Youth Olympics